The Foreign Assistance Act of 1974  was an Act of the 93rd United States Congress that added several amendments to the Foreign Assistance Act of 1961.

Aid to South Vietnam 
The Act effectively eliminated aid and military funding for South Vietnam. Direct US involvement in Vietnam was already prohibited under the Case–Church Amendment, and the termination of US funding and indirect support for South Vietnam was a significant factor leading to the Fall of Saigon.

Covert actions
The Act also included the Hughes–Ryan Amendment, which required the President to report all covert operations of the CIA to Congress within a set time limit, and placed limits on the funding of such operations. 

The Act also included other amendments, including, among others, appropriation of funds to Israel, Egypt, and Jordan, and the suspension of funds to Turkey due to the Turkish invasion of Cyprus.

Human rights
The Foreign Assistance Act of 1974 declared that it was the sense of the Congress that:
"except in extraordinary circumstances, the President shall substantially reduce or terminate security assistance to any government which engages in a consistent pattern of gross violations of internationally recognized human rights..."

The Act goes on define the term “gross violations of internationally recognized human rights” as including: 
"...torture or cruel, inhuman, or degrading treatment or punishment, prolonged detention without charges and trial, causing the disappearance of persons by the abduction and clandestine detention of those persons, and other flagrant denial of the right to life, liberty, or the security of person."

See also
 Hughes–Ryan Amendment
 Case–Church Amendment

References

1974 in law
United States foreign relations legislation
1974 in international relations